Howard Lovecraft and the Kingdom of Madness is a 2018 Canadian animated film written, directed and produced by Sean Patrick O'Reilly and sequel to 2016 and 2017 films Howard Lovecraft and the Frozen Kingdom and Howard Lovecraft and the Undersea Kingdom.

The film was Christopher Plummer's final voice acting role before his death in February 2021.

Plot 
After the events that occurred in the Frozen Kingdom and the Undersea Kingdom, young Howard finds himself at home. The walls of reality are thinning making the world vulnerable to dangers from beyond. Howard follows his father, Uncle Randolph and Dr. Henry Armitage as they journey to Antarctica, to prevent awaking of the destroyer of worlds, Cthulhu.

Development 
Shout! Factory announced their title releases at SDCC '18, which included Howard Lovecraft and the Kingdom of Madness. The Howard Lovecraft series is based on the graphic novel written by Bruce Brown. In an interview with WIRED, the author stated his inspiration came from the writings of American horror author H. P. Lovecraft as well as many of the character and setting names. This is the third and last installment of the trilogy. The final film in the series brings out a creature that "has long been foreshadowed" in the previous installments.

Cast 

 Christopher Plummer - Dr. Jeffrey West (Final voice role)
 Mark Hamill - Dr. Henry Armitage
 Kiefer O'Reilly - Howard Lovecraft
 Finn Wolfhard - Herbert West
 Nick Wolfhard - William Dyer
 Vijay Vaibhav Saini - Professor Jaswant Atwood
 Jeffrey Combs - Randolph Lovecraft
 Doug Bradley - Nyarlathotep
 Scott McNeil - Hamish Rice
 Sean Patrick O'Reilly - Spot/Cthulhu
 Ashleigh Ball - Ellen Ellery
 Tyler Nicol - Winfield Lovecraft
 Allison Wandzura - Mary Lovecraft
 Harmony O'Reilly - Innes
 Michelle O'Reilly - Sarah Lovecraft
 Phoenix O'Reilly - Twi'i
 Summer O'Reilly - Gotha

Release 
The film was released on December 4, 2018.

Home media 
Howard Lovecraft and the Kingdom of Madness was released on DVD and Blu-ray on December 4, 2018 by Shout! Factory which is part of their three feature distribution deal with Arcana Studio.

References

External links

2018 computer-animated films
Animated films based on comics
Arcana Studio titles
Canadian animated feature films
Canadian sequel films
Cthulhu Mythos films
Films based on Canadian comics
Films directed by Sean Patrick O'Reilly
2010s English-language films
2010s Canadian films